Scanair was a charter airline of Danish origins that operated between 1961 and 1994. Its head office was in Bromma, Stockholm Municipality, Sweden.

History 
Scanair was founded in Denmark in June 1961 and was partially owned by Scandinavian Airlines System (SAS).  The first aircraft operated was the Douglas DC-7 for charter flights to Spain, North Africa, and the United States.  In 1965 the headquarters was moved to Stockholm and SAS supplied Scanair with Douglas DC-8 aircraft.  Soon thereafter two Boeing 727 joined the growing fleet and Scanair soon became the biggest charter company in Scandinavia.  

Other destinations served throughout the years the Canary Islands, Sri Lanka, Thailand, and the winter resorts of Austria, Germany and Switzerland.  To increase capacity the Airbus A300 was acquired but the A300's range was not sufficient for the needs and those were soon replaced with Douglas DC-10s.  Scanair grew so much that by the 1980s was carrying over 2 million passengers a year, but that was not enough to turn a profit so it mergers with the Danish airline Conair of Scandinavia on 1 January 1994. The new airline was called Premiair.

Historical fleet details

3 - Airbus A300B4
3 - Boeing 727-134
1 - Boeing 747-143
3 - Boeing 747-283B
2 - Douglas DC-7C
3 - Douglas DC-8-33
2 - Douglas DC-8-55
3 - Douglas DC-8-62
2 - Douglas DC-8-62CF
5 - Douglas DC-8-63
2 - Douglas DC-8-63PF
3 - McDonnell Douglas MD-82
3 - McDonnell Douglas MD-83
6 - McDonnell Douglas DC-10-10
1 - McDonnell Douglas DC-10-30
Fleet references:

Business management

CEOs
1961–1968 - Svend Thorkild Thomasen
1968–1970 - Johan H Paus
1970–1971 - Anders Eriksson
1971–1976 - Carl-Olov Munkberg
1976–1982 - Georg Olsson
1982–1984 - Bengt A Hägglund
1984–1990 - Henrik Meldahl
1990–1991 - Jan Sundling
1991–1993 - Thomas Rosenqvist

Chairman of the board
1969–1978 - Knut Hagrup

References

External links

Code and fleet info
Scanair Magazine - Historien om Skandinaviens största charterflyg
SCANAIR historical website
SCANAIR uniforms at uniformfreak.com
Another SCANAIR history site
SCANAIR Fleet details

Defunct airlines of Sweden
Defunct airlines of Norway
Airlines established in 1961
Airlines disestablished in 1994
SAS Group
Defunct charter airlines
Defunct airlines of Denmark